The QCF Preparing to Teach in the Lifelong Learning Sector (PTLLS) qualification, sometimes referred to colloquially as "PETALS", is an initial teacher training qualification, studied at QCF Level 3 or 4, for those new to teaching, or wanting to start out as associate teachers, or currently teaching in the United Kingdom and requiring certification or qualification, or to become full teachers in Further Education (FE) or in the Lifelong Learning sector of education.

The PTLLS is currently the lowest of the teaching qualifications specifically for this sector of education, with others being the QCF Level 3/4 Certificate in Teaching in the Lifelong Learning Sector (CTLLS) and the QCF Level 5 Diploma in Teaching in the Lifelong Learning Sector (DTLLS) qualifications. Following successful completion of the PTLLS and upon achieving the qualification, an associate teacher would then have to take the more advanced CTLLS for the Certificate and after that the DTLLS for the Diploma.

To achieve the certification, the learner/associate teacher/trainer does not have to be in a teaching role in order to be assessed, making it a very achievable certification and a suitable starting point for anyone wanting to become an educator. Assessment is in the form of a 'micro-teach' session and submission of assignments and portfolio of evidence. The Level 4 CTLLS, however, requires one to be in a teaching or training role in order to be assessed 'on-the-job', as well as through the submission of assignments and a portfolio of evidence.

The PTLLS is the first stage of a PGCE (Post Graduate Certificate in Education) in Lifelong learning and is currently required prior to achieving the CTLLS and DTLLS to gain Qualified Teacher Learning and Skills (QTLS) status. It is a requirement that all teachers obtain the PTLLS award, or the equivalent, to be able to continue to teach in the further education sector in the UK.

The PTLLS is in the process of being phased out along with the CTLLS and the DTLLS, and will eventually be replaced with the Award in Education and Training qualification at QCF Level 3, 4 and 5, respectively.

References 

Educational qualifications in the United Kingdom
Teacher training